Ceryx hyalina is a moth of the subfamily Arctiinae. It was described by Frederic Moore in 1879. It is found in Myanmar and the Indian states of Sikkim and Assam.

References

Ceryx (moth)
Moths described in 1879